Northeast Airlines was an American airline based in Boston, Massachusetts that chiefly operated in the northeastern United States, and later to Canada, Florida, the Bahamas, Los Angeles and other cities. It was acquired by and merged into Delta Air Lines in August 1972.

History

The airline began as Boston-Maine Airways, founded as a Pan Am contract carrier on July 20, 1931, by the Boston and Maine Railroad and Maine Central Railroad, flying from Boston to Bangor via Portland. It flew only sporadically until August 11, 1933, when National Airways began to operate its flights under contract. National also operated Central Vermont Airways, a subsidiary of the Central Vermont Railway, and the two carriers together had a network across New England to New Hampshire, Vermont, and Montreal. Amelia Earhart and Eugene Vidal were among the co-founders of National, and Earhart was a prominent salesperson for the airline in its early years. National initially operated Stinson Airliners, and switched to a fleet of 10-passenger Lockheed Electras in November 1936.

The name Northeast Airlines was adopted on November 19, 1940. During World War II Northeast pioneered transatlantic service for the military under contract from the U.S. Army Air Forces. After the war, Northeast began hourly service between Boston and New York using DC-4s. Northeast applied for authorization to operate passenger service across the Atlantic but were stymied by the Civil Aeronautics Board, which awarded the routes to Pan American World Airways and TWA.

In 1956 Northeast began service to Washington National Airport, and received a temporary certificate to serve Florida, for which the airline purchased a fleet of new DC-6Bs. Beginning on December 17, 1959, Northeast became one of the early jet operators, flying a leased TWA Boeing 707-331 round trip between New York and Miami.

Northeast ordered ten Vickers Viscounts in the late 1950s and used them until financial problems in the early 1960s forced the company to return them to the manufacturer. Northeast leased a single Boeing 707 from TWA for 1959-60 winter flights to Florida. In 1960 Northeast leased six Convair 880s and flew them to Florida for several years.

Howard Hughes acquired control of the airline in 1962. The airline's temporary Miami route authority was terminated by a CAB decision that year, and Hughes decided to exit from the company, selling control to a trustee in 1964. Northeast launched an aggressive campaign against the CAB's decision, and got a permanent Florida certificate in 1965. In 1965 the airline was bought by Storer Broadcasting, who tried to rejuvenate Northeast in 1966 with a new marketing campaign and new aircraft. Northeast ordered a fleet of Boeing 727-100s for their Florida routes, and McDonnell Douglas DC-9-30s and Fairchild FH-227s for shorter routes. These "Yellowbirds" featured a new yellow and white livery. In 1966 Northeast was the launch customer for the Boeing 727-200, which they began flying in December 1967. Except for Florida their network was all north and east of Washington National Airport until 1969 when they added three 727 nonstops between Miami and Los Angeles, with Fort Lauderdale getting a short-lived LAX nonstop soon after (fuel stops were sometimes required on these transcontinental 727 flights). Northeast obtained rights to fly between Miami and Montreal in 1967, followed by rights to serve the Bahamas in 1968, and rights to serve Cleveland, Detroit, Chicago, and Bermuda in 1969, along with a new Miami-Los Angeles route authority.

In 1969, following a long period of financial difficulties, Northeast announced its intention to merge with Northwest Airlines. The merger was approved by both the CAB and President Richard Nixon in 1970, but it was conditional upon relinquishing the Miami-Los Angeles route. Northwest terminated the merger negotiations in March 1971, and Northeast announced a new merger plan with Delta Air Lines the following month. The Delta merger was approved in May 1972, with the same condition that Delta could not operate the Miami-Los Angeles route. The merger was completed in August 1972.

Northeast's contribution to Delta included access to the Boston market, which Delta had not served. Delta added the Boeing 727-100 and 727-200 to their fleet, types they did not operate prior to acquiring Northeast. Delta used these as the workhorses of their fleet in the 1970s and 1980s and at one point was the world's largest operator of the Boeing 727-200.

The airline's IATA code was NE.

Destinations
Northeast Airlines served the following destinations during its existence:

Domestic

California
Los Angeles (Los Angeles International Airport)
Connecticut
Hartford (Bradley International Airport)
New London (Groton-New London Airport)*
District of Columbia/Virginia
Washington, D.C. (Ronald Reagan Washington National Airport)
Florida
Fort Lauderdale/Hollywood (Fort Lauderdale-Hollywood International Airport)
Jacksonville (Imeson Airport)*
Miami (Miami International Airport)
Tampa (Tampa International Airport)
Illinois
Chicago (Chicago Midway Airport)
Maine
Auburn/Lewiston (Auburn/Lewiston Municipal Airport)*
Augusta (Augusta State Airport)
Bangor (Bangor International Airport)
Bar Harbor (Hancock County-Bar Harbor Airport)
Caribou (Caribou Municipal Airport)*
Houlton (Houlton International Airport)*
Machias/Calais (Machias Valley Airport)*
Millnocket (Millinocket Municipal Airport)*
Portland (Portland International Jetport)
Presque Isle (Northern Maine Regional Airport at Presque Isle)
Rockland (Knox County Regional Airport)
Waterville (Waterville Robert LaFleur Airport)
Maryland
Baltimore (Baltimore/Washington International Airport)
Massachusetts
Boston (Logan International Airport)
Fall River (Fall River Municipal Airport)*
Martha's Vineyard (Martha's Vineyard Airport)*
Fitchburg (Fitchburg Municipal Airport)*
Hyannis (Barnstable Municipal Airport)
Lawrence (Lawrence Municipal Airport)*
Nantucket (Nantucket Memorial Airport)
New Bedford (New Bedford Regional Airport)
Springfield (Metropolitan Airport)*
Worcester (Worcester Regional Airport)
Michigan
Detroit (Detroit Metropolitan Wayne County Airport)
New Hampshire
Berlin (Berlin Regional Airport)*
Concord (Concord Municipal Airport)*
Keene (Dillant-Hopkins Airport)*
Laconia (Laconia Municipal Airport)*
Lebanon/White River Jct. (Lebanon Municipal Airport)
Manchester (Grenier Field)
New Jersey
Newark (Newark Metropolitan Airport)
New York
New York City
LaGuardia Airport
John F. Kennedy International Airport
Ohio
Cleveland (Cleveland Hopkins International Airport)
Pennsylvania
Philadelphia (Philadelphia International Airport)
Rhode Island
Providence (Pawtucket-Providence North Central Airport)*
Vermont
Burlington (Burlington International Airport)
Montpelier/Barre (Edward F. Knapp State Airport)*
Newport (Newport State Airport)*

International

Bahamas
Freeport
Nassau
West End Airport*
Bermuda
Bermuda International Airport
Canada
New Brunswick
Moncton (Greater Moncton Roméo LeBlanc International Airport)
Saint John (Saint John Airport)
Nova Scotia
Halifax (Halifax Stanfield International Airport)
Quebec
Montréal (Montréal–Dorval International Airport)

An asterisk (*) denotes this airport is no longer served by scheduled air service.

Fleet

Prop Aircraft

Douglas DC-3
Douglas DC-6 ("A" and "B" models)
Convair 240
Curtiss C-46 - one aircraft acquired in 1954

Turboprop Aircraft

Bristol Britannia (ordered but not operated by nor delivered to the airline) 
Fairchild Hiller FH-227
Vickers Viscount 798 (operated by the airline until repossessed by Vickers)

Jet Aircraft

Boeing 707 (leased from Trans World Airlines (TWA))
Boeing 727-100
Boeing 727-200
Convair 880
Convair 990
Douglas DC-9-15
McDonnell Douglas DC-9-31

Accidents and incidents
A series of crashes damaged the airline's image:
 On 27 August 1931, a Sikorsky S.41B (NC41V) on a Boston-Maine Airways flight from Halifax to Boston, with a stop in Portland, ditched in the Atlantic off of Gloucester, Massachusetts. The pilot had been forced to descend to maintain visibility in thick fog and decided to ditch the plane, tearing a hole in the left pontoon. A fishing schooner rescued all but 1 of the 13 occupants from the wing, and the plane sank.
 11 August 1949 Portland, Maine — Convair CV-240-13
 On 30 November 1954, Northeast Airlines Flight 792 crashed on approach to Berlin Regional Airport, with two fatalities.
 On 1 February 1957, Northeast Airlines Flight 823 crashed shortly after takeoff from New York City's LaGuardia Airport, with 20 fatalities.
 On 15 September 1957, Northeast Airlines Flight 285 crashed on approach to New Bedford Regional Airport, killing 12 of the 24 passengers and crew.
 On 15 August 1958, Northeast Airlines Flight 258 crashed on approach to Nantucket Memorial Airport, killing 25 of the 34 passengers and crew.
 On 15 November 1961, Vickers Viscount N6592C was written off when it collided with Douglas DC-6 N8228H of National Airlines after landing at Logan International Airport. The DC-6 had started to take off without receiving clearance.
 On 25 October 1968, Northeast Airlines Flight 946 crashed on approach to Lebanon Municipal Airport, killing 32 of the 42 passengers and crew.

See also 
 List of defunct airlines of the United States

References

External links

 
Defunct airlines of the United States
Airlines based in Massachusetts
Delta Air Lines
Pan Am
Defunct companies based in Massachusetts
Airlines established in 1931
Airlines disestablished in 1972
American companies established in 1931
1931 establishments in Maine
1931 establishments in Massachusetts
1972 disestablishments in Massachusetts